Paul Matthew Dombroski (born August 8, 1956) is a former American football defensive back who played six seasons in the National Football League (NFL). He played college football at Linfield University. He was one of the few people of Okinawan descent to play in the NFL.

After retiring from the NFL, Dombroski went through a number of odd jobs before settling on opening and working at a hair salon. Dombroski is also a survivor of breast cancer, having been diagnosed in 2013 after noticing the signs early due to both his parents being diagnosed with cancer.

References

External links 
 Official website

1956 births
Living people
Sportspeople from Sumter, South Carolina
Players of American football from South Carolina
Players of American football from Hawaii
Hawaii people of Okinawan descent
American football defensive backs
Linfield Wildcats football players
Kansas City Chiefs players
New England Patriots players
Tampa Bay Buccaneers players